Backhousia gundarara is a tree in the family Myrtaceae. The only known population occurs in the Kimberley region in Western Australia.

References

gundarara
Trees of Australia
Myrtales of Australia
Rosids of Western Australia
Plants described in 2012
Taxa named by Russell Lindsay Barrett
Taxa named by Lyndley Craven
Taxa named by Matthew David Barrett
Endemic flora of Western Australia